Jordanita benderi is a moth of the family Zygaenidae. It is found in the High Atlas in Morocco.

The length of the forewings is 11.6–14.6 mm for males and 9.2 mm for females. Adults are on wing from March to the beginning of May.

The larvae probably feed on Carthamus lanatus.

References

C. M. Naumann, W. G. Tremewan: The Western Palaearctic Zygaenidae. Apollo Books, Stenstrup 1999, 

Procridinae
Endemic fauna of Morocco
Moths described in 1985
Moths of Africa